Omicron Hill is a summit in North Slope Borough, Alaska, in the United States.

Omicron Hill took its name from a surveyor's triangulation station atop the summit.

References

Mountains of Alaska
Mountains of North Slope Borough, Alaska